Lake Arapa is a peruvian lake situated in the Arapa and Chupa Districts in the Azángaro Province of the Puno Region. It is located 40 km from Juliaca.

See also
List of lakes in Peru

References
INEI, Compendio Estadistica 2007, page 26

Lakes of Peru
Lakes of Puno Region